Dendrite derives from the Greek word "dendron" meaning ( "tree-like"), and may refer to:

Biology
Dendrite, a branched projection of a neuron
Dendrite (non-neuronal), branching projections of certain skin cells and immune cells

Physical
Dendrite (metal), a characteristic tree-like structure of crystals growing as molten metal freezes
Dendrite (mathematics), a locally connected continuum that contains no simple closed curves
Dendrite (crystal), a crystal that develops with a typical multi-branching tree-like form
Dendrimer, a repetitively branched molecule

Software
 Dendrite (matrix), a server for the matrix protocol written in Go

Brand
Dendrite (adhesive), a brand of contact cement from India and South Asia

See also 
 Dendroid (disambiguation)